Diego Armando Echeverri Gil (born 21 July 1989) is a Colombian professional footballer who plays for Deportes Quindío as a forward.

Career
Born in Medellín, Echeverri has played for Cortuluá, Real Cartagena, Atlético Bucaramanga, Cúcuta Deportivo and Deportivo Pereira. In April 2016 he claimed that he and his family were attacked by people dressed as Atlético Bucaramanga fans.

References

1989 births
Living people
Colombian footballers
Colombian expatriate footballers
Cortuluá footballers
Real Cartagena footballers
Atlético Bucaramanga footballers
Cúcuta Deportivo footballers
Deportivo Pereira footballers
Club Always Ready players
Atlético Huila footballers
Boyacá Chicó F.C. footballers
Categoría Primera B players
Categoría Primera A players
Bolivian Primera División players
Association football forwards
Colombian expatriate sportspeople in Bolivia
Expatriate footballers in Bolivia
Footballers from Medellín
Deportes Quindío footballers